The Women's Bandy World Championships is an international sports tournament for women and the premier international competition for women's bandy between bandy-playing nations. The tournament is administrated by the Federation of International Bandy.

It is distinct from the Bandy World Cup Women which is a women's club competition, the Bandy World Cup which is a club competition for men, and from the Bandy World Championship which is the premier international bandy competition for men's teams.

A Youth Bandy World Championship also exists separately from the women's senior competition and has competitions in both the male and female categories, with the F17 WC tournament representing the youth World Championship in bandy for girls up to 17 years of age.

Although the sport of bandy has been played by both men and women since the 19th century, the first men's world championship didn't take place until 1957, and the first official women's international bandy tournament only began in 2004. However, an international match between women's bandy teams from Sweden and Finland took place in Helsinki, Finland in 1935 at the Helsinki Ice Stadium, where a portion of the match was captured by British Pathé. The archival short film has been uploaded and published on the video sharing site, YouTube.

In 2023, the tournament will for the first time take place at the same time in the same arena as the equivalent among men.

Participating nations 
Until 2020,Sweden, Russia, Finland, Norway and USA have participated in every tournament, Canada in most of them,  Hungary in two and China debuted in 2016. The record number of participants were 8, in 2018 and 2020. Estonia and Switzerland debuted in 2018, and Japan in 2020. Ukraine is scheduled to make its debut in 2023.

Participation details

Top results year by year

Medal table

Bandy World Championship G-17 

The Bandy World Championship G-17 or U17 (under 17) world championship in bandy for women, known as F17 WC and U17-världsmästerskapet i bandy för damer in Sweden, is the youth world championship in bandy for girls up to 17 years of age. The competition is held separately from the World Bandy Women's Championship which is for adults. G17 is sometimes written as F17 and the Y designations may also be written with a U.

The Youth Bandy World Championship is a tournament for girls' teams up to the age of 17 years. FC 17 is the only age group for which the world championship in bandy for young female players is held. The first tournament was held in 2009 and has since been held every two years.

Normally only teams from the main bandy countries of Finland, Norway, Russia and Sweden participate, but the United States has participated a few times and at the tournament in Irkutsk 2017, a China U17 team made its debut.

U17 medal table

Gallery

See also 
 Bandy
 Rink bandy

Women's Bandy World Championship
 Sweden women's national bandy team
 Russia women's national bandy team
 Finland women's national bandy team
 Norway women's national bandy team
 United States women's national bandy team
 Switzerland women's national bandy team
 China women's national bandy team
 Canada women's national bandy team
 Hungary women's national bandy team
 Soviet Union women's national bandy team

References 

 
Bandy
World Championship
Recurring sporting events established in 2004
February sporting events
Women's bandy